Remimazolam, sold under the brand name Byfavo, is a medication for the induction and maintenance of procedural sedation in adults for invasive diagnostic or surgical procedures lasting 30 minutes or less. is a benzodiazepine drug, developed by PAION AG in collaboration with several regional licensees as an alternative to the short-acting imidazobenzodiazepine midazolam, for use in the induction of anesthesia and conscious sedation for minor invasive procedures. Remimazolam was found to have both a more rapid onset and a shorter duration than midazolam, and human clinical trials showed a faster recovery time and predictable, consistent pharmacokinetics, suggesting some advantages over existing drugs for these applications.

The most common side effects for procedural sedation include low blood pressure, high blood pressure, diastolic hypertension, systolic hypertension, low blood oxygen level, and diastolic hypotension.

Remimazolam was approved for medical use in the United States in July 2020, and in the European Union in March 2021.

Medical uses
Remimazolam is indicated for the induction and maintenance of procedural sedation in adults lasting 30 minutes or less.

History
Remimazolam was approved for medical use in the United States in July 2020.

The U.S. Food and Drug Administration (FDA) approved remimazolam based on evidence from three clinical trials (Trial 1/NCT02290873, Trial 2/NCT02296892 and Trial 3/NCT02532647) in adults undergoing short procedures. Trials were conducted at 32 sites in the United States.

Trials 1 and 3 were conducted in participants undergoing colonoscopy and Trial 2 was conducted in participants undergoing bronchoscopy procedures.

In the trials, participants were randomly divided in three groups: one group received remimazolam, one group received placebo and one group received midazolam (similar, but approved drug). In the first two groups, neither participants nor investigators knew which medications were given and participants could also receive midazolam as a rescue drug when needed for sedation. In the third group, all participants received midazolam only Additionally, in all three trials participants received a medication for pain control

Trials 1 and 2 compared participants who received remimazolam to participants in the other two groups, measuring the success of sedation with the set of pre-determined criteria. Data from Trial 3 were used primarily to assess the side effects of remimazolam when multiple dosing is used.

Society and culture

Legal status
On 28 January 2021, the Committee for Medicinal Products for Human Use (CHMP) of the European Medicines Agency (EMA) adopted a positive opinion, recommending the granting of a marketing authorization for the medicinal product Byfavo, intended for procedural sedation. The applicant for this medicinal product is PAION Netherlands B.V. Remimazolam (Byfavo) was approved for medical use in the European Union in March 2021.

Research
Phase I and Ib dose-finding studies for procedural sedation with patients recovering faster from remimazolam than midazolam. Phase II trials comparing remimazolam to the standard anesthesia protocols for cardiac surgery and colonoscopy were presented at major conferences in October 2014.

A Phase IIa trial comparing remimazolam to midazolam for upper endoscopy was published in December 2014, finding a similar safety profile. Remimazolam was originally synthesized in the late 1990s at Glaxo Wellcome in their labs in Research Triangle Park, North Carolina.

References

External links
 
 
 
 

GABAA receptor positive allosteric modulators
Imidazobenzodiazepines
2-Pyridyl compounds
Bromoarenes
Methyl esters